"C'est toi qui m'as fait" is a 1989 song recorded by French singer François Feldman. Written by Jean-Marie Moreau, Thierry Durbet and Feldman, it was the third single from the album Une Présence, released in 1989, on which it appears as the eighth track. It was successful, becoming Feldman's third top two hit. Lyrically, it is a tribute to his mother, referring to her as the person who "built" and "created" him, and his father, who expected for a daughter when his wife was pregnant.

The song was included on Feldman's three best of, in a remixed version : first on Two Feldman (1996) on which it appears as the fourth track on the first CD, then on Best Feldman (1998) as the third track, last on Gold (2008) as the fourth track; it was also performed during Feldman's 1991 tour and was thus included on the live album Feldman à Bercy (1992).

Chart performance
In France, "C'est toi qui m'as fait" debuted at number 24 on the chart edition of 14 April 1990, reached the top ten two weeks later, peaked at number two in its eighth week, being unable to dislodge Elton John's "Sacrifice", which topped the chart then. It totalled 12 weeks in the top ten and fell off the top 50 after 18 weeks. It achieved Silver status, awarded by the Syndicat National de l'Édition Phonographique, the French certificator, for over 200,000 units sold.

On the Eurochart Hot 100 Singles, it debuted at number 71 on 28 April 1990 and peaked at number 11 in the eighth week, and spent 16 weeks on the chart. It also charted for 11 weeks on the European Airplay Top 100, with a peak at number 20 on 2 June 1990, in the fourth week.

Track listings
 7" single
 "C'est toi qui m'as fait" — 3:54	
 "Pour faire tourner le monde" — 3:50

 12" maxi
 "C'est toi qui m'as fait" (Extended version) — 5:35	
 "Pour faire tourner le monde" — 3:50	
 "C'est toi qui m'as fait" (Single version) — 3:54

 CD maxi
 "C'est toi qui m'as fait" (Single version) — 3:54
 "Bébé faut qu'on s'casse" — 4:26
 "Oser, Oser" — 4:07
 "C'est toi qui m'as fait" (Extended version) — 5:35

Charts and sales

Weekly charts

Year-end charts

Certifications

Release history

References

1989 songs
1990 singles
François Feldman songs